The New Sound of the Venezuelan Gozadera is an album by the Venezuelan band Los Amigos Invisibles, released in 1998.

Critical reception
The Sun Sentinel called the album "dance music as self-referentially playful and goofy as anything the B-52s have ever recorded." Robert Christgau thought that "as members of the international brotherhood of bored middle-class collegians, their specialty is crappy music with a concept."

The Washington Post concluded that "in addition to strolling bass, percolating congas, squawking sax and cooing female back-up vocals, the group incorporates hip-hop tricks into such tracks as 'No Me Pagan'." The Los Angeles Times determined that "sex and American funk are this Venezuelan sextet's obsessions, and they are fused in a cheeky U.S. debut album filled with wacky disco references and quasi-pornographic lyrics."

Track listing

"Güelcome"
"Ultra-Funk"
"Mi Linda"
"Sexy"
"Las Lycras del Avila"
"Groupie"
"Otra Vez"
"Cachete A Cachete"
"Balada De Chusy"
"Asomacho"
"Ponerte En Cuatro"
"Mango Cool"
"Nerio Compra Contestadora"
"Quiero Desintegar A Tu Novio"
"El Disco Anal"
"No Me Pagan"
"Cha-Chaborro"
"Aldemaro En Su Camaro"
"The New Sound of the Venezuelan Gozadera"

References

1998 albums
Luaka Bop albums
Los Amigos Invisibles albums